Julian Victor Frow Roberts (born 7 June 1957) is a British businessman. He was the chief executive of Old Mutual plc, an international long-term savings group until October 2015.

Early life
His father played rugby for Newport and was a reserve for Wales. Roberts has a BA degree from the University of Stirling, where he played rugby for the first team.

He qualified as an accountant at PricewaterhouseCoopers in 1983, and moved
into the insurance industry, working for C E Heath, in 1987.

Career
He was Chief Executive of Old Mutual from September 2008 until October 2015, having joined the company in August 2000 as Group Finance Director, moving on to become CEO of Skandia following its purchase by Old Mutual in February 2006. Prior to joining Old Mutual, he was Group Finance Director of Sun Life & Provincial Holdings plc and, before that, Chief Financial Officer of Aon UK Holdings Limited.

He was also a non-executive Director of Nedbank.

Personal life
He met his wife Marion whilst a student at Stirling University. They have three sons and a daughter.

References

1957 births
Living people
British accountants
British chief executives
British corporate directors
Alumni of the University of Stirling